Appointment with Fear was a horror drama series originally broadcast on BBC Radio in the 1940s and 1950s, and revived  on a number of occasions since. The format comprised a dramatised horror story of approximately half an hour in length, introduced by a character known as the Man in Black. The plays themselves were a mixture of classic horror stories by writers such as Edgar Allan Poe, M. R. James and W. W. Jacobs, and commissioned stories by new or established writers. Many of the stories in the early series were written or adapted by John Dickson Carr.

Appointment with Fear (1943-1955 and 1976)
Appointment with Fear ran for nine series between 1943 and 1955, initially on the BBC Home Service and from September 1945 on the Light Programme. The Man in Black was played by the British character actor Valentine Dyall, except in the second series where he was portrayed by Dyall's father Franklin Dyall. Only four episodes are known to survive. A tenth series was broadcast on the BBC World Service in 1976.

Series 1
'Cabin B13' by John Dickson Carr. 11 September 1943 
'The Pit and the Pendulum', adapted by John Dickson Carr from Edgar Allan Poe, 18 September 1943 
'Into Thin Air' by John Dickson Carr, 21 September 1943 
'The Body Snatchers' adapted by John Dickson Carr from Robert Louis Stevenson, 30 September 1943 
'The Customers Like Murder' by John Dickson Carr, 7 October 1943  
'Will You Make a Bet With Death?' by John Dickson Carr, 14 October 1943 
'The Devil's Saint' by John Dickson Carr, 21 October 1943
'Fire Burn and Cauldron Bubble' by John Dickson Carr, 28 October 1943 
'The Phantom Archer' by John Dickson Carr, 4 November 1943
'The Man Who Died Twice' by John Dickson Carr, 11 November 1943
'Menace In Wax' by John Dickson Carr, 18 November 1943

Series 2
'Vex Not His Ghost' by John Dickson Carr, 6 January 1944
'The Tell Tale Heart' adapted by John Dickson Carr from Edgar Allan Poe, 13 January 1944 
'The Room of the Suicides' by John Dickson Carr, 20 January 1944 
'The Sire de Maletroit's Door' adapted by John Dickson Carr from Robert Louis Stevenson, 27 January 1944 
'The Dragon in the Pool' by John Dickson Carr, 3 February 1944
'The Man Who Was Afraid of Dentists' by John Dickson Carr, 10 February 1944

Series 3
'The Speaking Clock' by John Dickson Carr, 13 April 1944
'Death Flies Blind' by John Dickson Carr, 20 April 1944
'A Watcher by the Dead' adapted by John Dickson Carr from Ambrose Bierce, 27 April 1944 
'The Pit and the Pendulum' adapted by John Dickson Carr from Edgar Allan Poe, 4 May 1944
'Vampire Tower' by John Dickson Carr, 11 May 1944
'The Clock Strikes Eight' by John Dickson Carr, 18 May 1944

Series 4
'I Never Suspected' by John Dickson Carr, 5 October 1944 
'The Devil's Manuscript' by John Dickson Carr, 12 October 1944 
'Death Has Four Faces' by John Dickson Carr, 19 October 1944 
'The Purple Wig' adapted by John Dickson Carr from G K Chesterton, 26 October 1944 
'He Who Whispers' by John Dickson Carr, 2 November 1944
'The Great Cipher' adapted by John Dickson Carr, from Melville Davisson Post, 16 November 1944 
'Vex Not His Ghost' by John Dickson Carr, 30 November 1944 
'The Curse of the Bronze Lamp' by John Dickson Carr, 7 December 1944
'The Gong Cried Murder' by John Dickson Carr, 14 December 1944
'Lair of the Devil Fish' by John Dickson Carr, 21 December 1944
'The Oath of Rolling Thunder' by John Dickson Carr, 28 December 1944

Series 5
'Into Thin Air' by John Dickson Carr, 11 September 1945 
'Fire Burn and Cauldron Bubble' by John Dickson Carr, 18 September 1945 
'The Man Who Died Twice' by John Dickson Carr, 25 September 1945
'The Clock Strikes Eight' by John Dickson Carr, 2 October 1945 
'Cabin B13' by John Dickson Carr, 9 October 1945 
'Will You Make a Bet With Death?' by John Dickson Carr, 16 October 1945

Series 6
'He Wasn't Superstitious' adapted by John Dickson Carr from Ambrose Bierce, 23 October 1945 
'The Man With Two Heads' by John Dickson Carr, 6 November 1945  
'The Case of the Five Canaries' by John Dickson Carr, 13 November 1945
'And The Deep Shuddered' by Monckton Hoffe, 20 November 1945 
'The Case' by John Slater and Roy Plomley, 27 November 1945  
'Death at Midnight' by Robert Barr, 4 December 1945

Series 7
'The Nutcracker Suite' by E Crowshay-Williams and J Leslie Dodd, 26 March 1946
'Black Mamba' by Hugh Barnes and AR Ramsden, 2 April 1946 
'The Cask of Amontillado' adapted by Laidman Browne from Edgar Allan Poe, 9 April 1946 
'A Watcher by the Dead' adapted by John Dickson Carr from Ambrose Bierce, 16 April 1946 
'The Man Who Knew How' adapted by Ronald Cunliffe from Dorothy L Sayers, 23 April 1946 
'Dead Men's Teeth' by Charles Hatton and Richard Fisher, 30 April 1946 
'Experiment With Death' by Harry Bunton, 7 May 1946
'Death Takes a Honeymoon' by Mileson Horton and WL Catchpole, 14 May 1946 
'Renovations at Merrets' adapted by Rankine Good from Honoré de Balzac, 21 May 1946 
'The Monkey's Paw' adapted by Louis N Parker from WW Jacobs, 28 May 1946
'Cottage For Sale' by TJ Waldron, 4 June 1946
'A Mind in Shadow' by Kenneth Morgan, 11 June 1946

Special
'Escape to Death' by Mileson Horton, 25 December 1946

Series 8
'Mrs Amworth' adapted by Charles Hatton from EF Benson, 25 February 1947
'Sink or Swim Together' by ???, 4 March 1947
'The Last Pilgrimage' by TJ Waldron, 11 March 1947
'The Bell Room' adapted by Lester Powell from Edgar Allan Poe, 25 March 1947
'The Diary of William Carpenter' adapted by Patric Dickinson from John Atkins, 1 April 1947 
'The Treasures' adapted by Charles Hatton from Gilbert Frankau, 8 April 1947 
'The Hands of Nekamen' adapted by Lester Powell from Kathleen Hyett, 22 April 1947  
'All Cats May Snarl' by J Vernon Basley, 29 April 1947

Special
'The Clock Strikes Eight' by John Dickson Carr, 14 January 1948

Special
'The Diary of William Carpenter' adapted by Patric Dickinson from John Atkins, 23 January 1948

Series 9
'The Man Who Couldn't Be Photographed' by John Dickson Carr, 23 July 1955 
'White Tiger Passage' by John Dickson Carr, 2 August 1955 
'The Dead Man's Knock' by John Dickson Carr, 9 August 1955 
'The Sleuth of Seven Dials' by John Dickson Carr, 16 August 1955 
'The Villa of the Damned' by John Dickson Carr, 23 August 1955 
'Till the Great Armadas Come' by John Dickson Carr, 30 August 1955

Series 10
There was no tenth series in 1957, it was merely a repeat broadcast of Series Nine.

Tie-In Publication
Appointment with Fear(Fenmore Publications, 1948. Ed. Ronald Flatteau
Death Takes a Honeymoon by Mileson Horton
Watcher by the Dead by Ambrose Bierce 
The Monkey’s Paw by WW Jacobs
The Pit and the Pendulum by Edgar Allan Poe
A Mind in Shadow by Kenneth Morgan
Berenice by Edgar Allan Poe

The Man in Black (1949)
The Man in Black was broadcast for one series of eight episodes in 1949, also on the Light Programme, and again presented by Valentine Dyall in the title role. No episodes are known to have survived.
'Markheim' adapted by John Keir Cross from Robert Louis Stevenson, 31 January 1949
'Oh, Whistle and I'll Come to You, My Lad' adapted John Keir Cross from MR James, 7 February 1949
'The Middle Toe of The Right Foot' adapted by John Keir Cross from Ambrose Bierce, 14 February 1949
'Our Feathered Friends' adapted by John Keir Cross from Philip Macdonald and 'Thus I Refute Beelzy' adapted by John Keir Cross from John Collier, 21 February 1949
'The Judge's House' adapted by John Keir Cross from Bram Stoker, 28 February 1949
'The Yellow Wallpaper adapted by John Keir Cross from Charlotte Perkins Gilman, 7 March 1949 
'The Beast With Five Fingers adapted by John Keir Cross from W. F. Harvey, 14 March 1949 
'The Little House' by John Keir Cross, 21 March 1949

Fear on Four (1988)
Fear on Four ran for five series on BBC Radio 4 between 1988 and 1992, the part of the Man in Black being played by Edward de Souza. A fifth series was broadcast in 1997, this time without a narrator. An anthology of stories from the first two series was published by BBC Books in 1990.

Series One 

 The Snowman Killing by J. C. W. Brook, 3 January 1988
 William and Mary by Roald Dahl, dramatised by Jill Brooke, 10 January 1988
 The Monkey's Paw by W. W. Jacobs, adapted by Patrick Galvin, 17 January 1988
 Music Lovers by Nick Warburton, 24 January 1988
 The Beast with Five Fingers by W. F. Harvey, dramatised by John Kier Cross, 31 January 1988
 Every Detail but One by Bert Coules, 7 February 1988
 By the River, Fontainebleau by Stephen Gallagher, 14 February 1988
 The Face by E. F. Benson, dramatised by Michael Bakewell, 21 February 1988
 Mind Well the Tree by William Ingram, 28 February 1988
 Fat Andy by Stephen Dunstone, 6 March 1988
 A Day at the Dentist's by James Saunders, based on an idea by Arch Oboler, 13 March 1988
 The Speciality of the House by Stanley Ellin, dramatised by Colin Haydn Evans, 20 March 1988

Series Two 

 Snipe 3909 by Graeme Fife, 15 January 1989
 The Dead Drummer by David Buck, 22 January 1989
 The Dispossessed Daughter by Katherine Nicholas, 29 January 1989
 St Austin Friars by Stephen Wyatt, adapted from a short story by Robert Westall, 5 February 1989
 Dreaming of Thee by Gwen Cherrell, 12 February 1989
 The Horn by Stephen Gallagher, 19 February 1989
 The Journey Home by Bert Coules, 26 February 1989
 Hand in Glove
 His Last Card
 Survival
 Soul Searching
 A Child Crying
 The Judge's House

Series Three 

 The Yellow Wallpaper
 Green and Pleasant
 The Monkey's Revenge
 Invitation to the Vaults
 The Edge
 Dead Man's Boots
 A Routine Operation?
 Dance in the Underworld

Series Four 

 Gobble, Gobble
 The Next in Line by Ray Bradbury dramatised by Brian Sibley
 Dark Feathers
 Playing God
 Vicious Fish
 Hellhound on My Trail
 Hearing is Believing
 Life Line

Series Five 

 The Blood of Eva Bergen
 Net Suicide
 Tissue Memory
 Chimes at Midnight

The Man in Black (2009)
The series was revived again in 2009, on BBC Radio 4 Extra, this time as The Man in Black, with Mark Gatiss in the title role. It ran for four series, each with five episodes, between 2009 and 2011.

Reruns of the 2009 version started to air on BBC Radio 4 Extra on April 24, 2020.

Series One
 The Tower
 Project Purple
 The White Hare
 Hide and Seek
 Bombers' Moon

Series Two
 Phish Phood
 Death Us Do Part
 Flesh
 Angels in Disguise
 The Old Road

Series Three
 Connect
 The Printed Name
 Lights Out
 Uncle William's House
 Perfect Home

Series Four
 Containment
 The Punt
 The Beaten Track
 Reunion
 The New Boy

Film adaptation
In 1950, Hammer and Exclusive Films released a feature film based on the series entitled The Man in Black.
The stars were Betty Ann Davies, Sheila Burrell, and Sid James, with Valentine Dyall reprising his role as the Man in Black.

References

BBC Light Programme programmes
BBC Home Service programmes
BBC Radio 4 programmes
BBC Radio 4 Extra programmes